General Sir Abraham Roberts  (11 April 1784 – 28 December 1873) was a British East India Company Army general who served nearly 50 years in India.

Roberts had two sons, who both obtained the highest ranks in the British Army. One son and a grandson would win the Victoria Cross, the highest decoration for bravery in the face of the enemy in the British Army.

Early life

Abraham Roberts was a member of a famous Waterford family. He was the son of Anne (Sandys) and The Reverend John Roberts, a magistrate in County Waterford and a rector of Passage East.

Career
General Sir Abraham Roberts gained the rank of colonel in the service of the Honourable East India Company and was the commander of the 1st Bengal European Regiment and the Lahore Division. He fought in the First Afghan War.

Roberts was invested as a Knight Grand Cross of the Order of the Bath (GCB). He left India in 1853 to live in Ireland with his second wife, who outlived him. He also had a home in Bristol, 25 Royal York Crescent, Bristol, Somerset BS8 – England.

From 1862 until his death, he was Colonel of the 101st Regiment of Foot (Royal Bengal Fusiliers).

Family

He married Frances Isabella Ricketts, daughter of George Poyntz Ricketts, on 20 July 1820. On the death of his first wife, he married Isabella Bunbury, daughter of Abraham Bunbury, on 2 August 1830.

Children with Frances Isabella Ricketts
Frances Eliza Roberts
Maria Isabella Roberts
Major General George Ricketts Roberts

Children with Isabella Bunbury
Harriet Mercer Roberts
Field Marshal Frederick Sleigh Roberts, 1st Earl Roberts

Arms

Footnotes

People from County Waterford
Knights Grand Cross of the Order of the Bath
British East India Company Army generals
British military personnel of the First Anglo-Afghan War
19th-century Anglo-Irish people
1784 births
1873 deaths
Irish soldiers in the British East India Company Army
19th-century Irish people